Pabiben Rabari is from Bhadroi Village in Anjar Taluka of Kutch, Gujarat. She started embroidery work at an early age and invented a new embroidery art form called 'Hari Jari'. Rabari formed a company to produce a line of shopping bags called the Pabi Bag that is used in many Bollywood and Hollywood Movies.

Early life 
Pabiben dropped out of school after standard IV, and then later she has started the Embroidery Work.

Participation & Design Selection 
 Design Selected for Hollywood Film “ The Other End of The Line “
 Pabiben’s design has been selected for Bollywood Film “Luck by Chance“
 Selection for Santa Fe Folk Art Festival, Santa Fe, USA , Year 2013
 Participate in International Buyer Seller Meet, Ahmedabad, Year 2015
 Participate in Design Workshop with Vietnamese artisans in Delhi
 Participate in theme based exhibition-Kutch center of the world at India International Centre, New Delhi.

References 

Embroidery in India